Rufus D. Harris is a retired American professional basketball player. He was the America East Conference co-Player of the Year as a senior in 1979–80 while playing for the University of Maine. After graduating, Harris was selected in the 1980 NBA draft by the Boston Celtics, although he never played in the National Basketball Association. Instead, he carved a professional career in both the Continental Basketball Association and international leagues.  Harris played from 1980 to 1983 in the CBA, for the Maine Lumberjacks and Lancaster Lightning.  In 88 CBA games he averaged 18.8 points per game.

While playing for the Maine Black Bears between 1976–77 and 1979–80, Harris scored a still-standing school record 2,206 points. His 718 total points and 25.6 per game average in 1979–80 are both single season records as well.

Rufus is the nephew of Larry Garron, a well known former Boston Patriots running back.

Legal troubles 
On December 6, 2016, Harris was arrested in Framingham, Massachusetts and charged with disorderly conduct after police say he danced in the middle of a busy intersection and was "yelling for no lawful purpose" as music played from his cell phone. After representing himself in court the case was reviewed and dismissed for $20 in court costs.

Further reading

References

Year of birth missing (living people)
Living people
American expatriate basketball people in the Philippines
American men's basketball players
Basketball players from Massachusetts
Boston Celtics draft picks
Framingham High School alumni
Lancaster Lightning players
Maine Black Bears men's basketball players
Maine Lumberjacks players
People from Framingham, Massachusetts
Sportspeople from La Grange, Illinois
Philippine Basketball Association imports
Small forwards
San Miguel Beermen players